Gerald C. Duffy (1896 – June 25, 1928) was a screenwriter of the silent film era, as well as a journalist, and short story writer and copyeditor. He is best known for his many contributions to Redbook magazine, which he edited, as well as being nominated for an Academy Award for Best Title Writing in the 1st Academy Awards for the film The Private Life of Helen of Troy. His prolific fiction career brought him to the attention of First National Pictures who hired him on as a writer.

Gerald died in 1928 while dictating a script in Los Angeles, California.

Selected filmography

A Fighting Colleen (1919)
Jinx (1919)
 Dollars and Sense (1920)
The Slim Princess (1920)
Officer 666 (1920)
What Happened to Rosa (1920)
 Hold Your Horses (1921)
Trust Your Wife (1921)
Through the Back Door (1921)
Her Social Value (1921)
Where's My Wandering Boy Tonight? (1922)
Head Over Heels (1922)
Mr. Barnes of New York (1922)
Sure Fire Flint (1922)
The Spider and the Rose (1923)
 You Are Guilty (1923)
Bright Lights of Broadway (1923)
 The Spider and the Rose (1923) 
 Three O'Clock in the Morning (1923)
 Roulette (1924)
The Recoil (1924)
 Her Own Free Will (1924)
Youth for Sale (1924)
Trouping with Ellen (1924)
Argentine Love (1924)
Too Many Kisses (1925)
The Sky Raider (1925)
Tramp, Tramp, Tramp (1926)
The College Boob (1926)
Don Juan's Three Nights (1926)
Kosher Kitty Kelly (1926)
The Timid Terror (1926)
Bred in Old Kentucky (1926)
The Masked Woman (1927)
The Notorious Lady (1927)
See You in Jail (1927)
The Patent Leather Kid (1927)
The Crystal Cup (1927)
The Private Life of Helen of Troy (1927)
Her Wild Oat (1927)
The Heart of a Follies Girl (1928)
Wheel of Chance (1928)
The Head Man (1928)
Out of the Ruins (1928)

References

External links

American male screenwriters
American short story writers
American male journalists
20th-century American journalists
1896 births
1928 deaths
American male short story writers
20th-century American male writers
20th-century American screenwriters